Ilovci is a small dispersed settlement in the eastern part of the Slovene Hills in the Municipality of Ljutomer in northeastern Slovenia. The area belongs to the traditional region of Styria and is now included in the Mura Statistical Region.

References

External links
Ilovci on Geopedia

Populated places in the Municipality of Ljutomer